Bojonegoro District is a town which serves as the capital of Bojonegoro Regency, East Java, Indonesia.

Demographics

Administration
Bojonegoro District is divided into 18 administrative villages.

Education
Bojonegoro District has a comprehensive education system. Primary and secondary education institutions in Bojonegoro include 33 elementary schools, 10 junior high schools, 5 vocational senior secondary schools, 6 senior high school. Higher education are provided by Universitas Bojonegoro, Universitas Terbuka, Sekolah Tinggi Ilmu Ekonomi Cendekia, Sekolah Tinggi Ilmu Kesehatan Icsada, Sekolah Tinggi Ilmu Kesehatan Muhammadiyah, Akademi Kesehatan Rajekwesi, Akademi Kebidanan Pemerintah Kabupaten Bojonegoro, Akademi Komunitas Negeri Bojonegoro, and IKIP PGRI Bojonegoro.

Climate
Bojonegoro has a tropical monsoon climate (Am) with moderate to little rainfall from May to October and heavy rainfall from November to April.

Transport
Bojonegoro District and nearby areas in Bojonegoro Regency are well served by Bojonegoro railway station with a direct connection to Jakarta, as well as to Surabaya, Semarang, Bandung, Ngawi and Malang.

References

Districts of East Java
Solo River
Bojonegoro Regency
File-Class United States articles